Cholame (Salinan: Tco'alam) is an unincorporated community in San Luis Obispo County, California, United States. Cholame is reached via State Route 41, just southwest of the junction of Route 46. Rainfall data from a nearby ranch shows that the area around Cholame only receives about eight to nine inches (200–230 mm) of rain in a normal year.

History
Cholame was originally a rancheria of the Salinian Indians,  Rancho Cholame  was an 1844 Mexican land grant. In 1867 William Welles Hollister (1818–1886) purchased Rancho Cholame. Hollister sold a half interest in the rancho to Robert Edgar Jack in 1869.

Jack studied at Maine Wesleyan Seminary, and he later was an accountant at a shipping house in New York City. In the Civil War he enlisted in the 56th New York Volunteer Infantry Regiment, and he served in Harrisburg, Pennsylvania, during the Battle of Gettysburg and then in New York to quell "anti-Negro riots" there. Near the end of the war, he moved to California and became Hollister's accountant and secretary on the latter's San Justo Ranch surrounding the present city of Hollister. When that property was subdivided, the two bought the Cholame land. Jack married Hollister's daughter, Lucy Ellen (Nellie) in 1870 and became the largest wool grower in Central California, later switching to cattle and agriculture. Jack organized the County Bank of San Luis Obispo.

The land was sold to the Hearst Corporation in 1966 and is still a working cattle ranch.

James Dean

On September 30, 1955, actor James Dean was killed in a traffic collision when college student Donald Turnupseed made a left turn without seeing Dean's Porsche 550 Spyder approaching at the junction of State Highways 41 and 46. On the same date in 2005, the State of California observed the 50th anniversary of Dean's death by naming the intersection as the James Dean Memorial Junction. A few hundred people, including state officials, a Dean family member, several Dean archivists and fans gathered at the junction and in Cholame to pay tribute to the actor.  A memorial to Dean was erected in 1977 near a local restaurant by a retired Japanese businessman from Kobe, Seita Ohnishi. The monument is made of stainless steel and surrounds a tree of heaven.

Jack Ranch Cafe

Jack Ranch Cafe is a cafe and restaurant in Cholame on Highway 46 close to highways 41 and 46 junction.  It is opposite the James Dean memorial.

References

James Dean
Unincorporated communities in San Luis Obispo County, California
Unincorporated communities in California